Gemini Nunatak is a nunatak consisting of two almost ice-free peaks,  high, which are connected by a narrow rock ridge, standing  south of Borchgrevink Nunatak on Philippi Rise, on the east coast of Graham Land, Antarctica. It was charted by the Falkland Islands Dependencies Survey (FIDS) and photographed from the air by the Ronne Antarctic Research Expedition in 1947. It was named by the FIDS after the constellation Gemini, which contains the twin stars Castor and Pollux.

References

Nunataks of Graham Land
Oscar II Coast